Fairmount Cemetery is a  rural cemetery in the West Ward of Newark, New Jersey, in the neighborhood of Fairmount. It opened in 1855, shortly after the Newark City Council banned burials in the central city due to fears that bodies spread yellow fever. The first burial in Fairmount Cemetery was a 24-year-old man named Lewis J. Pierson. Fairmount is still accepting interments.

Along with Mount Pleasant Cemetery, Fairmount has the graves of Newark's most eminent turn of the century citizens, including Clara Maass, who gave her life in the investigation of yellow fever.  A high proportion of the graves belong to German families. Fairmount Cemetery includes large trees, rolling hills, and intricately carved monuments.  Featured near the old South Orange Avenue entrance is the recently restored zinc Settlers' Monument, commemorating the founders of Newark.  There is also a Civil War memorial. The modern entrance to Fairmount Cemetery is on Central Avenue.

Notable burials

 Harriet Adams (1893–1982), pseudonymous author of many books in the Nancy Drew series and a few in the Hardy Boys series
 Leila Bennett (1892–1965), actress
 Peter Angelo Cavicchia (1879–1967)
 Henry Meade Doremus (1851–1921), Mayor of Newark from 1903 to 1907
 Thomas Dunn English (1819–1902), represented New Jersey's 6th congressional district from 1891 to 1895
 Christian William Feigenspan (1836–1939), president of Newark's Feigenspan Brewing Company
 James Fairman Fielder (1867–1954), Governor of New Jersey from 1913 to 1917
 William Henry Frederick Fiedler (1847–1919), represented New Jersey's 6th congressional district from 1883 to 1885
 Gwen Guthrie (1950–1999), singer-songwriter
 Fred A. Hartley Jr. (1902–1969)
 Georgiana Klingle Holmes (1841–1940), wrote poetry under the name George Klingle
 Henry Lang (1828–1897), Mayor of Newark from 1882 to 1883
 Frederick Lehlbach (1876–1937)
 Herman Lehlbach (1845–1904), represented New Jersey's 6th congressional district from 1885 to 1889
 Clara Maass (1876–1901), nurse who died as a result of volunteering for medical experiments to study yellow fever
 Le Gage Pratt (1852–1911)
 Needham Roberts (1901–1949), African-American World War I veteran who was decorated for bravery

References

External links 
 Newark History Tour of Fairmount
 Fairmount Cemetery  at The Political Graveyard
 

Cemeteries in Newark, New Jersey
Monuments and memorials in New Jersey
Rural cemeteries
Tourist attractions in Newark, New Jersey